Haplochromis macconneli is a species of cichlid endemic to Lake Turkana, northern Kenya.  This species can reach a length of  SL. The specific name honours the Officer in Charge of the Fisheries Department at Lake Rudolf (now known as Lake Turkana),  R. B. McConnell, for the assistance he gave to the Lake Rudolf Research Project.

References 

Fish described in 1974
macconneli
Endemic freshwater fish of Kenya
Fish of Lake Turkana
Taxonomy articles created by Polbot